Cast Offs is a BAFTA-nominated comedy-drama mockumentary that follows a group of six disabled people sent to a remote British Island for a fictional reality show.

The series is made up of six episodes, with each episode concentrating on one of the six characters. It follows each character for the year leading up to them being dropped off on the island (other than Carrie's episode, which followed her time after she left the island) and also the happenings on the island when they are left to fend for themselves.

Characters 
Dan (Peter Mitchell), sportsman, 26 years old, paraplegic
Tom (Tim Gebbels), actor, 39 years old, blind
Will (Mat Fraser), political activist, 46 years old, thalidomide-affected
Gabriella (Sophie Woolley), mother-to-be, 32 years old, deaf
April (Victoria Wright), research scientist, 34 years old, cherubism
Carrie (Kiruna Stamell), unemployed, 29 years old, dwarfism

Plot synopsis

References

External links

Victoria Wright's website
Mat Fraser's official website

2009 British television series debuts
2009 British television series endings
2000s British comedy-drama television series
2000s British television miniseries
Channel 4 original programming
British comedy-drama television shows
English-language television shows
Television shows set in Nottinghamshire
Television series by Sony Pictures Television